Mykle is a lake in the municipality of Kongsberg in Viken county, Norway.

Mykle is located below Bonden mountain near the border with Telemark. Mykle is part of the Siljan watershed (Siljanvassdraget) formed by rivers with headwaters at Skrimfjella which flow into Farris lake at Larvik. The watershed is developed with four power stations and was protected against further development in 1973. Mykle offers trout and perch fishing.

See also
List of lakes in Norway

References

Lakes of Viken (county)